Thissa Sanjeewa (born 1 May 1992) is a Sri Lankan cricketer. He made his first-class debut for Ragama Cricket Club in the 2015–16 Premier League Tournament on 11 February 2016.

References

External links
 

1992 births
Living people
Sri Lankan cricketers
Chilaw Marians Cricket Club cricketers
Ragama Cricket Club cricketers